Rachael Bermingham is an Australian entrepreneur, author, public speaker, mentor and former TV personality and hairdresser.
Rachael has written 10 bestselling books (9 self-published and 1 published) since 2006. Her books are nearing sales of 8 million copies.

Books
Rachael's first book Read My Lips was written with co-authors Cyndi O'Meara, Jodie McIver, Fleur Whelligan, Kim Morrison, and Allison Mooney, and released 14 February 2006. Rachael's second book 4 Ingredients was co-written with Kim McCosker (Turnbull), as were the following books within the series, 4 Ingredients 2, 4 Ingredients Gluten Free, "4 Ingredients Fast, Fresh & Healthy" and "4 Ingredients Kids". Rachael and Kim celebrated their first title being named bestselling title of 2008 (it was 2nd bestselling title to JK Rowling's Harry Potter and the Deathly Hallows in 2007 the year of its release).

In 2010, Rachael launched her own book distribution and education company (Bermingham Books) and mentors authors on how to write, publish and promote their own titles.

The following year, in 2011, Bermingham revealed she was leaving her association with the 4 Ingredients franchise after selling her 50% stake to co-founder Kim McCosker. Bermingham also divorced her husband around the same time.

In 2012, Bermingham released her 8th book "Savvy" ingredients for success—a motivational and inspiration book for women wanting to build a business from home around their family commitments.

In the following years, Rachael stopped travelling and left the public eye to dedicate her time to raising her 3 boys, write, mentor and develop her book production company which she still manages today. Still no less the superwoman she's often been cited as being, she is President of The Beach Matters Group, a 7000+ strong group focused on protecting and preserving the beach. Bermingham, once a professional diver at Mooloolaba's Underwater World (now known as Sea Life), is also an avid surfer with a women's group called Women In Waves, and is often spotted out in the water at the popular Sunshine Coast surfing breaks at Kawana, Maroochydore and Alexandra Headland.

Bermingham released her 2 book titles "How to Write Your Book" and "How to Market Your Book" in 2017, and has ghostwritten several titles since. She is actively at the helm producing around 50 books a year through her boutique publishing business for mostly Australian authors. 
More information can be found on her website www.RachaelBermingham.com

She also has a Facebook and Instagram page.

Television
Bermingham has also previously appeared on the TV show 4 Ingredients, which aired in 23 countries including Australia, Africa, UK and New Zealand. She also did a weekly stint on Channel 9's Today Show until exiting public life.

Personal life
Rachael lives on Australia's Sunshine Coast and has three sons, Jaxson, 16 years old and 11-year-old twin boys Bowie and Casey.

References

External links

Australian television presenters
Australian women television presenters
Australian food writers
Living people
Year of birth missing (living people)